Greg Fields may refer to:

 Greg Fidelman (born 1965), American record producer sometimes credited as Greg Fields
 Greg Fields (American football) (born 1955), American football player